Heartbreak on Vinyl is the second studio album by American singer-songwriter Blake Lewis released on October 6, 2009 by Tommy Boy Records. A double LP pressed on red vinyl with only 500 copies was released on August 13, 2010. The vinyl contained instant access to the Heartbreak on Vinyl digital album, 13 remixes of the hit single "Heartbreak on Vinyl" and an unreleased remix of "'Till We See the Sun." Although "Heartbreak on Vinyl" became his most successful single, the album only sold 10,000 copies; less than 1/30 of the copies of his debut A.D.D. (Audio Day Dream).

Critical reception

Stephen Thomas Erlewine from AllMusic said "he's brought all his disparate interests together on Heartbreak on Vinyl, which cut for cut is more rhythmic and melodic than A.D.D. and as a whole lot more memorable. Lewis doesn't separate his club rhythms and Morrissey obsessions, winding up with a record that sounds curiously and unwittingly like a soundtrack to a Eurotrash club, but in an appealing fashion because it feels uncontrived and often very catchy."

Max Specht from Pressplus1 said "This album is a melting pot of styles that really sums up the kind of artist Blake Lewis is, he’s all over the place yet centered all at once.  He’s an homage as much as he is a trailblazer in pop music, and this album will help find him fans with commuters blasting the radio, to night owls dancing the night away in crowded clubs down main street."

Track listing
Heartbreak on Vinyl

Chart performance
The album debuted at number 135 on the Billboard Top 200, selling 4,000 albums in its first week.

Singles
 "Sad Song" was released as the lead single from the album on July 21, 2009. The music video was filmed in late August 2009 and released on September 21, 2009.
 "Heartbreak on Vinyl" was released as the second single from the album on January 19, 2010. It has since become his first Number One hit on the U.S. Billboard Hot Dance Club Play chart for the week of April 24, 2010. The single also reached number one on Billboard's Hot Dance Airplay chart in its May 22, 2010, issue, another first for Lewis. It is to date his most successful single.
 "Till' We See the Sun (Remix)" With the announcement of his special edition of his album, Lewis announced this bonus track would be the third single from the album and would a radio only single. The original version of this song was released in mid-2012.

Album credits
Performance credits
 Blake Lewis – Primary Artist, Vocals, Turntables
 Eve Nelson – Piano, Vocals
 Peter Zizzo – Background Vocals
 Joe Doria – Keyboards
 Carl Ryden – drums, Keyboards, Vocals
 KJ Sawka – drums
 Steve McMorran – Vocals
 Mark Maxwell – Synthesizer
 Dave Katz – Keyboards
 Ben Levels – Keyboards

Technical credits
 Peter Zizzo – Arranger, Programming, engineer
 Jim Bottari – Engineer
 Carl Ryden – Programming
 Sean Gould – Engineer
 KJ Sawka – Programming, engineer
 Blake Lewis – Engineer
 Mark Maxwell– Programming, producer, engineer

Release history

References

2009 albums
Albums produced by Rodney Jerkins
Blake Lewis albums